William Howell Quillian is an American literary critic and James Joyce scholar. He is Professor Emeritus of English at Mount Holyoke College.

Background
Quillian graduated with an A.B. in English from Princeton University in 1965 after completing a senior thesis titled "The Name of Adam: A Study of Henry Miller." He then received a B.A. and M.A. from Cambridge University in 1973 and returned to Princeton for graduate studies. He received a Ph.D. from  Princeton University in 1975 after completing a doctoral dissertation titled "Prince Hamlet in the age of modernism: James Joyce and T.S. Eliot."

Publications

Select articles
"Composition of Place': Joyce's Notes on the English Drama." James Joyce Quarterly, vol. 13, pp. 4–26, 1975.
"Shakespeare in Trieste: Joyce's 1912 Hamlet Lectures." James Joyce Quarterly, vol. 12, pp. 7–63, 1975.

New York Times - Letters
 20 September 2006: Response to the debate regarding  Bob Dylan's 2006 album, Modern Times in light of T. S. Eliot.

Book
Hamlet and the New Poetic: James Joyce and T. S. Eliot (Ann Arbor, MI: UMI Research Press, 1983).

Joyce and hypertext
He has also been involved with Michael Groden's group in the envisioning and development of Joyce's Ulysses as hypertext and hypermedia as well as other aspects of the digital humanities.

See also
 Modernist literature
 Modernist poetry
 Hypertext

References

External links
Official site

Year of birth missing (living people)
Living people
Alumni of the University of Cambridge
James Joyce scholars
Literary critics of English
Modernism
Mount Holyoke College faculty
Princeton University alumni